The 1963 San Jose State Spartans football team represented San Jose State College during the 1963 NCAA University Division football season.

San Jose State played as an Independent in 1963. The team was led by seventh-year head coach Bob Titchenal, and played home games at Spartan Stadium in San Jose, California. The Spartans finished  with a record of five wins and five losses (5–5) and were outscored 187 to 194.

Schedule

Team players in the NFL/AFL
No San Jose State players were selected in the 1964 NFL Draft or 1964 AFL Draft.

The following finished their San Jose State career in 1963, were not drafted, but played in the NFL.

Notes

References

External links
 Game program: San Jose State at Washington State – October 12, 1963

San Jose State
San Jose State Spartans football seasons
San Jose State Spartans football